The 2006 MAC men's basketball tournament, a part of the 2005-06 NCAA Division I men's basketball season, took place from March 6–March 11, 2006 at Quicken Loans Arena in Cleveland. The March 6 first-round games were held at the higher seeds home arenas. Its winner received the Mid-American Conference's automatic bid to the 2006 NCAA tournament. It is a single-elimination tournament with four rounds and the four highest seeds received byes in the first round. All MAC teams were invited to participate. Kent State, the MAC regular season winner, received the number one seed in the tournament. Kent State defeated seventh-seeded Toledo in the final. In the NCAA tournament they lost in the first round to Pittsburgh.

Tournament

Seeds 
The top two seeds of the tournament were given to division winners. Since Kent State had a better record than Northern Illinois, they were given the #1 seed, and the Huskies were given the #2 seed. The remainder of the bracket was determined by overall record. For the #3 seed, Akron and Miami were tied with a 14–4 conference record. They had also split their two regular season matches. The next tiebreaker is to determine the teams performance against ranked teams in order. Akron was able to win one game against the Golden Flashes while Miami was unable to win one, so Akron was given the fourth seed and Miami was given the final bye in the tournament. The #5 seed was determined through a three-way tie between Ohio, Toledo, and Western Michigan. Ohio had won its matches against Western Michigan and Toledo so they were given the #5 seed. Since Toledo was able to defeat Kent State in the regular season and Western Michigan was not, they were given the #6 seed. Buffalo was seven games behind Kent State and had earned the eighth seed. Ball State was the #9 seed and the final East Division team, Bowling Green was the #10 seed. The final two teams, Eastern Michigan and Central Michigan were given the eleventh and twelfth seeds, respectively.

Bracket

First round

Quarterfinals

Semi-finals

Finals

References 

Tournament
MAC men's basketball tournament
MAC men's basketball tournament
Mid-American Conference men's basketball tournament
Basketball in Cleveland